Sediliopsis ondulum is an extinct species of sea snail, a marine gastropod mollusk in the family Pseudomelatomidae, the turrids and allies.

Description

Distribution
Fossils of this species were found in Pliocene strata of Florida, USA.

References

 Fargo, William G. The Pliocene Turridae of Saint Petersburg, Florida. 1953; Monographs of the Academy of Natural Sciences of Philadelphia 18:365–409, pls. 16–24

ondulum
Gastropods described in 1953